The Real-time Transport Protocol (RTP) specifies a general-purpose data format and network protocol for transmitting digital media streams on Internet Protocol (IP) networks. The details of media encoding, such as signal sampling rate, frame size and timing, are specified in an RTP payload format. The format parameters of the RTP payload are typically communicated between transmission endpoints with the Session Description Protocol (SDP), but other protocols, such as the Extensible Messaging and Presence Protocol (XMPP) may be used.

Audio and video payload types

RFC 3551, entitled RTP Profile for Audio and Video (RTP/AVP), specifies the technical parameters of payload formats for audio and video streams.

The standard also describes the process of registering new payload types with IANA; additional payload formats and payload types are defined in the following specifications:
 , Standard 65, RTP Profile for Audio and Video Conferences with Minimal Control
 , Media Type Registration of Payload Formats in the RTP Profile for Audio and Video Conferences
 , RTP Payload Format for 12-bit DAT Audio and 20- and 24-bit Linear Sampled Audio
 , RTP Payload Format for H.264 Video
 , RTP Payload Format for Transport of MPEG-4 Elementary Streams
 , RTP Payload Format for MPEG-4 Audio/Visual Streams
 , RTP Payload Format for MPEG1/MPEG2 Video
 , RTP Payload Format for High Efficiency Video Coding (HEVC)
 , RTP Payload Format for JPEG-compressed Video
 , RTP Payload Format for H.261 Video Streams
 , RTP Payload Format for PureVoice Audio Video
 , RTP Payload Format for Uncompressed Video
 , RTP Payload Format for the Opus Speech and Audio Codec
 , RTP Payload Format for JPEG XS

Payload identifiers 96–127 are used for payloads defined dynamically during a session. It is recommended to dynamically assign port numbers, although port numbers 5004 and 5005 have been registered for use of the profile when a dynamically assigned port is not required.

Applications should always support PCMU (payload type 0); previously, DVI4 (payload type 5) was also recommended, but this was removed in 2013 by RFC 7007.

Text messaging payload 
 , RTP Payload Format for Text Conversation

MIDI payload 
 , RTP Payload Format for MIDI
 , An Implementation Guide for RTP MIDI

See also
 Session Initiation Protocol
 H.323
 Comparison of audio coding formats

References

External links
IANA assignments of Real-Time Transport Protocol (RTP) Parameters

VoIP protocols